Heinz Bigler (27 January 1949 – 20 December 2021) was a Swiss footballer and manager who played as a defender. He died on 20 December 2021, at the age of 72.

References

1949 births
2021 deaths
Swiss men's footballers
Association football defenders
BSC Young Boys players
FC Thun players
FC St. Gallen players
Swiss football managers
FC St. Gallen managers
FC Schaffhausen managers
FC Gossau managers
FC Winterthur managers